Three Gipsy-class destroyers served with the Royal Navy;  Osprey, Fairy and Gipsy were three funnelled  C-class destroyers built by Fairfield with Thorneycroft boilers. Leven, Falcon and Ostrich are sometime referred to as the Falcon class but are here listed under the Gipsy class.

Ships

See also

References

Destroyer classes